Charles H. Kraft (b. 1932 in Connecticut) is an American anthropologist, linguist, evangelical Christian speaker, and Professor Emeritus of Anthropology and Intercultural Communication in the School of Intercultural Studies at Fuller Theological Seminary in Pasadena, California, where he taught primarily in the school's spiritual-dynamics concentration. In the domain of religion, his work since the early 1980s has focused on inner healing and spiritual warfare.  He joined Fuller's faculty in 1969. In the 1950s he served as a Brethren missionary in northern Nigeria. He has served as a professor of African languages at Michigan State University and UCLA, and taught anthropology part-time at Biola University. He holds a BA from Wheaton College, a BD from Ashland Theological Seminary, and a PhD from the Hartford Seminary Foundation, titled "A Study Of Hausa Syntax".

In 1982, with fellow Fuller missions professor Peter Wagner, Kraft became an early proponent of the teaching and ministry models of John Wimber, and helped popularize the "Third Wave of the Holy Spirit", which Wimber's Vineyard Movement represented.

Charles is widely recognized as one of the foremost evangelical Missionary anthropologist in the world.

Main interests 
Kraft writes and teaches about biblical Christianity and culture (including contextualization), communicating biblical Christianity, anthropology and Christianity, cross-cultural Christian theology, worldview, spiritual warfare, inner healing, generational curses, and the evils of Freemasonry. In addition to his work at Fuller, Kraft is the president and founder of Deep Healing Ministries, a deliverance ministry, and conducts seminars and exorcisms around the world. He lives in California with his wife.  He serves as the Vice-President of Hearts Set Free Ministries, where he conducts seminars on spiritual warfare, healing, and deliverance.

His most influential and controversial work is Christianity in Culture (1979). He proposed an approach to contextualization using the "dynamic equivalence" method of Bible translation as a model to describe how Christianity itself must be translated into a culture by adopting new forms that communicate biblical meanings.

He has taught and ministered in Nigeria, Korea, Thailand, Papua New Guinea, Australia, India, Denmark, Norway, England, Holland, New Zealand, South Africa, Canada, Japan, Switzerland, and Germany.

Selected works
Kraft's published books include:

I Give You Authority
Defeating Dark Angels: Breaking Demonic Oppression in the Believer's Life 
Confronting Powerless Christianity: Evangelicals and the Missing Dimension 
Christianity With Power: Your Worldview and Your Experience of the Supernatural 
Communication Theory for Christian Witness 
Confronting Powerless Christianity: Evangelicals and the Missing Dimension 
The Rules of Engagement: Understanding the Principles that Govern the Spiritual Battles in Our Lives
Anthropology for Christian Witness 
Behind Enemy Lines: An Advanced Guide to Spiritual Warfare  
Deep Wounds, Deep Healing: Discovering the Vital Link Between Spiritual Warfare and Inner Healing  
Teach Yourself Hausa Complete Course (Teach Yourself) 
Culture, Communication, and Christianity: A Selection of Writings 
Communicating Jesus' Way 
Introductory Hausa 
Deep Wounds, Deep Healing: A Guide to Receiving and Praying for Inner Healing 
A Hausa reader: Cultural materials with helps for use in teaching intermediate and advanced Hausa 
Readings in Dynamic Indigeneity 
Chadic wordlists (Marburger Studien zur Afrika- und Asienkunde) 
Christianity in Culture: A Study in Dynamic Biblical Theologizing in Cross-Cultural Perspective (1979, revised 2005).
Two Hours to Freedom: A Simple and Effective Model for Healing and Deliverance (Oct. 2010)
Issues in Contextualization (2016)

Sources

External links
 Fuller Theological Seminary bio
 Wayback Machine Archive of Fuller Theological Seminary bio
 Prayer Ministries
 Hearts Set Free Ministries
 

1932 births
Missiologists

20th-century Baptists
21st-century Baptists
People from Connecticut
Baptists from Connecticut
Spiritual warfare
Ashland University alumni
Hartford Seminary alumni
Michigan State University faculty
University of California, Los Angeles faculty
Biola University faculty
Fuller Theological Seminary faculty
American exorcists
American non-fiction writers
Living people
American Charismatics
Wheaton College (Illinois) alumni
American expatriates in Nigeria